Skultuna Messingsbruk (literally, "Skultuna Brass Works") is a Swedish manufacturer of brass and brass products. Founded in 1607 at the behest of King Karl IX, Skultuna Messingsbruk is located in Skultuna on the outskirts of Västerås. The logotype of Skultuna consists of the closed royal crown, the name "Skultuna" and the founding year "1607".

Early history

In the year 1607, King Karl IX could at last implement his long held plans for a Swedish brass industry. He had a man sent off on the Crown's business to find a suitable location for a brass foundry. The choice fell on Skultuna, where the Svartån brook provided sufficient water power. Charcoal was available here as well, there was a harbor in Västerås and the copper mine at Falun was also close. Skultuna Messingsbruk was founded and the king's decision confirmed in a letter dated 11 February 1607. The work could proceed. The history of the brass foundry During the time of Gustav Wasa and Erik XIV, Sweden had become indebted to the Hanseatic League. Refining copper into brass would reduce imports of brass and increase income from exports. The work was divided up between different workshops, each one supervised by a master craftsman. The early products consisted mainly of brass plate, chandeliers and candlesticks. Some of these designs are still in production, like the Office Candlestick and Chandeliers. Near the end of the 19th century Skultuna worked closely with the Swedish designer Carl-Hjalmar Norrström who created a number of classic items for it, among these a baptismal font in brass, copper and silver that won the gold medal at the Stockholm Exhibition in 1897 and the Paris Exhibition in 1900.

Present day

The production in Skultuna is continuing in an unbroken line since 1607, every year about five hundred chandeliers are built, a couple of thousand candlesticks are mounted and polished, thousands of cuff links are packaged and shipped around the world. There are two product lines today: Home Accessories and Fashion Accessories and it is working closely with some of the world's leading designers like Ilse Crawford, Richard Hutten Claesson Koivisto Rune, Monica Förster and Thomas Sandell. Among the many designers that worked with the firm through 1900s Sigvard Bernadotte and Pierre Forssell stands out with their timeless modernism.

Royal Warrant Holder to the Swedish Court

Skultuna is a Purveyor to the Court of Sweden. Since its foundation in 1607, at the behest of King Karl IX, it has been a Royal Warrant Holder to the Swedish court. To qualify for a warrant, the order must come from the royal court to which the company must deliver its goods or services. A royal warrant is personal and usually awarded to the managing director of the company rather than the company itself. All goods and services are paid for by the court.[1] Crown Princess Victoria visited Skultuna Messingsbruk on 14 June 2007 during the 400-year anniversary and inaugurated a bronze memorial plaque of the founder King Karl IX.

Tourism & The Factory Shops

This factory is one of the most visited tourism attractions in Sweden with over 150 000 visitors each year. There tourists can visit the museum, the café and the shops that recently have been opened in the old factory buildings.

See also
 List of oldest companies

Footnotes

References
 Sigurd Erixon, Skultuna Bruks Historia, part I-II.

External links

 Skultuna Messingsbruk, official website

Manufacturing companies of Sweden
Purveyors to the Court of Sweden
Companies based in Västmanland County
1607 establishments in Sweden